David Shepard (born 30 December 1970) is an Australian former cricketer. He played one first-class cricket match for Victoria in 1998. He is now an umpire and stood in the tour match between Cricket Australia XI and England in November 2017, during England's tour of Australia.

See also
 List of Victoria first-class cricketers

References

External links
 

1970 births
Living people
Australian cricketers
Australian cricket umpires
Victoria cricketers
Cricketers from Melbourne